Clarence Dock may refer to:

 Clarence Dock (Leeds), Leeds, Historic Site and retail, tourist and leisure destination
 Clarence Dock (Liverpool), Liverpool, Historic Site